Men's Needs, Women's Needs, Whatever is the third studio album by English indie rock band The Cribs. It was released on 21 May 2007 through Wichita Recordings in the UK and Warner Bros. Records in the U.S. Critically acclaimed, the album propelled the band into a greater audience, reaching number thirteen on the UK Album Charts, number nine on the annual 'Albums of the Year' by influential UK music magazine NME and various other end-of-year lists. The album's lead single, "Men's Needs", also reached number three in the same NME chart.

Background and recording
At the conclusion of The New Fellas campaign, the Cribs signed a major label deal with Warner Bros. Records in North America, retaining Wichita Recordings in the UK and Ireland. Recording for the album began in autumn 2006 with Franz Ferdinand lead vocalist Alex Kapranos as producer at the Warehouse Studio, Vancouver, British Columbia. With the majority of the album recorded, the band undertook a run of small club dates to preview the new songs, captured on the accompanying Leave too Neat documentary. Further sessions took place at Avatar, New York City in spring 2007, producing "Be Safe", a collaboration with Lee Ranaldo of Sonic Youth, and "Shoot the Poets", which closes the record. David Corcos engineered the sessions, whereas Andy Wallace mixed the record, with all the songs receiving mastering treatment at Alchemy, London, from John Davis.

Composition
Rob Crane designed the cover and inlay artwork with the photograph originally being taken by Bert Hardy, with Bob Taylor photographing the Belle Vue stadium shot and Janette Beckman taking the couch shot. Gary plays bass and provides vocals, Ross sticks to drums and Ryan takes guitar and vocal duties. Lee Ranaldo takes on lead vocals for "Be Safe".

Singles
The album produced four singles: "Men's Needs" preceded on 14 May 2007, with "Moving Pictures" following on 30 July. The double a-side "Don't You Wanna Be Relevant?"/"Our Bovine Public" introduced a new song recorded shortly after the album sessions finished on 15 October, and "I'm a Realist" closed the run on 25 February 2008.

Reissue
On July 29, 2022, The Cribs released reissues of their first three albums, the main reason for which was because the albums' vinyl editions had been out of print for some time. After regaining the rights and master tapes for the albums through the legal battle that caused the band's inactivity several years prior, they spent 2021 sifting through their archives for bonus material to include on the reissues. All three reissued albums entered the Top Ten of the midweek UK Albums Chart.

Accolades

Track listing

Charts

References

External links

2007 albums
Albums recorded at The Warehouse Studio
The Cribs albums
Wichita Recordings albums